Dr Darien Graham-Smith is a British journalist, scholar and thespian. He was born in London in 1975.

Dr Graham-Smith holds the title of Deputy Editor at the British periodical PC Pro, published monthly by Dennis Publishing, where he is responsible for coverage of technical issues ranging from microprocessor architecture to operating systems. He is an occasional contributor to the news media, appearing on the BBC News channel in December 2008 to discuss security weaknesses in Internet Explorer.

Graham-Smith is also a co-presenter of the Open University's 2010 introduction to computing module, entitled "Inside the Box", alongside the BBC's Spencer Kelly.

Prior to entering journalism, Dr Graham-Smith studied English literature at Trinity College, Cambridge before progressing to specialise in Victorian literature at the University of Wales, Bangor. Academically he is best known for his research into the works and ideas of Lewis Carroll in the context of the broader Victorian intellectual tradition. His work Contextualising Carroll was published by the University of Wales, where he holds his doctorate and where he was, during 2000-2, editor in chief of University newspaper Seren. While at the University of Cambridge, he was also the assistant editor of Graduate Varsity.

He is also notable for his involvement in independent theatre: achievements include co-writing The Cat Must Die, which The Times named critics' choice at the 2002 Edinburgh Fringe Festival, and directing the South London Theatre's 2005 production of A Doll's House by Henrik Ibsen.

External links
 
BBC review of The Cat Must Die
Seren newspaper website

1975 births
Living people
Alumni of Trinity College, Cambridge